Guanine nucleotide-binding protein G(T) subunit gamma-T1 is a protein that in humans is encoded by the GNGT1 gene.

References

Further reading

External links